HNLMS Van Galen (F834) is a ship of the  of multi-purpose frigates of the Royal Netherlands Navy. Built by the shipyard Koninklijke Schelde Groep in Vlissingen. The ship is named after captain and convoy commander Johan van Galen and served from 1994 to 2008  with the Dutch navy. The radio call sign of the frigate was "PAMG".

History

HNLMS Van Galen is one of eight s and built at the Koninklijke Schelde Groep yard in Vlissingen. The keel laying took place on 7 June 1990 and the launching on 21 November 1992. The ship was put into service on 1 December 1994.

The ship participated in the UNIFIL mission off the coast of Lebanon.

In 2009 HNLMS Van Galen was sold Portugal. The ship was transferred in 2010 to the Portuguese Navy, where the ship was put into service as the NRP Dom Francisco de Almeida (F334).

References

Bibliography
Joris Janssen Lok, 'The Netherlands: Dutch M frigates are ready for action,' Jane's Defence Weekly/Jane's Information Group, 14 October 1995
 
 
 

Karel Doorman-class frigates
Ships built in Vlissingen
1992 ships
Bartolomeu Dias-class frigates